Andringa is a surname. Notable people with the surname include:

Casey Andringa (born 1995), American freestyle skier
Joris Andringa (1635–1676), Dutch naval officer
Robbert Andringa (born 1990), Dutch volleyball player

See also
Andrina (disambiguation)